The Holy Synod of the Serbian Orthodox Church serves by Church constitution as the executive body of the Serbian Orthodox Church. The Holy Synod consists of five members: four bishops and the Patriarch who serves as the chairman.

Current members

See also 
 Serbian Orthodox Church#Structure
 Bishops' Council of the Serbian Orthodox Church

References 

Serbian Orthodox Church
Governing assemblies of religious organizations